Santos FC is a soccer club based in Nazca, Peru. It was founded in 1976 and since 2019 plays in Peruvian Segunda División.

History 

Santos FC was founded on May 30, 1976 in the District of Vista Alegre and joined Vista Alegre's District Soccer League.

Current squad

As of 2018.

Honours

Regional
Liga Departamental de Ica:
Winners (2): 2012, 2018

Liga Provincial de Nasca:
Winners (1): 2018
Runner-up (1): 2012

Liga Distrital de Vista Alegre:
Winners (1): 2014
Runner-up (2): 2012, 2018

References

Association football clubs established in 1976